My Mother's Wedding is an upcoming British film drama that marks the directorial debut of Kristin Scott Thomas from her own screenplay co-written with John Micklethwait. It is set to star Scott Thomas with Scarlett Johansson, Freida Pinto, Sienna Miller and Emily Beecham.

Synopsis 
Three sisters return to their family home to attend the wedding of their twice widowed mother Diana. All three sisters have had different life experiences with Georgina being a palliative nurse, whilst Victoria is an actress, and Katherine is a captain in the Royal Navy.

Cast

Production 
In June 2022 it was revealed that Johansson and Scott Thomas were working together on a new film that was set to be Scott Thomas first directing role. That same month Miller, Pinto and Beecham were added to the cast. Filming of a wedding took place on location in Hampshire at St. Mary's Church, Ashley in June 2022 whilst Johansson was reported to be filming Naval scenes on the HMS Prince of Wales in Portsmouth.

Principal photography was reported as being completed by the end of July 2022, with Scott Thomas being quoted as saying she found the experience "exhilarating" and that it was "thrilling to create this fictional family using my own childhood memories as a springboard." The film marks the third time Scott Thomas and Johansson have played mother and daughter, following The Horse Whisperer (1998) and The Other Boleyn Girl (2008).

References

External links

Upcoming films
2020s English-language films
British drama films
Films about families
Films about mother–daughter relationships
Films about weddings
Films about weddings in the United Kingdom
Films shot in Hampshire
Films about the Royal Navy
Upcoming directorial debut films